Linderniaceae is a family of flowering plants in the order Lamiales, which consists of about 25 genera and 265 species occurring worldwide. Vandellia micrantha is eaten in Laos, but tastes bitter. Best known are the wishbone flowers Torenia fournieri and Torenia thouarsii, which are used as bedding plants, especially in the tropics. Micranthemum is sold as an aquarium plant when it is called 'baby tears'.

In other classifications it used to be included within family Scrophulariaceae sensu lato or more recently in Plantaginaceae sensu lato, but several authors have demonstrated that this taxon should be segregated from those families, as Linderniaceae, and it has been recognized by LAPG II and APG III.
Recently a phylogeny has been published  and two new Brazilian genera Catimbaua and Isabelcristinia were recently added to the family. Studies on the family limits of Linderniaceae are pending.

List of genera
Compiled from sources GRIN: and the World Checklist of Vascular Plants:
 Ameroglossum Eb.Fisch., S.Vogel & A.V.Lopes
 Artanema D.Don
 Bampsia Lisowski & Mielcarek
 Bonnaya Link & Otto
 Bythophyton Hook.f.
 Catimbaua L.P.Felix, Christenh. & E.M.Almeida
 Chamaegigas Dinter ex Heil
 Craterostigma Hochst. - sometimes considered as part of Lindernia
 Crepidorhopalon Eb.Fisch.
 Cubitanthus Barringer
 Dintera Stapf
 Encopella Pennell
 Hartliella Eb.Fisch.
 Hemiarrhena Benth.
 Isabelcristinia L.P.Felix, Christenh. & E.M.Almeida
 Legazpia Blanco (sometimes included in Torenia)
 Lindernia All.
 Linderniella Eb.Fisch., Schäferh. & Kai Müll.
 Micranthemum Michx.
 Microcarpaea R.Br.
 Picria Lour.
 Pierranthus Bonati
 Schizotorenia T.Yamaz.
 Scolophyllum T.Yamaz.
 Stemodiopsis Engl.
 Torenia L.
 Vandellia L.

References

 
Lamiales families